Saint George Monastery or Deir Mar Georges is a historic Greek Orthodox monastery in the village of al-Mishtaya in the "Valley of the Christians" (Wadi al-Nasara), belonging to the Homs Governorate in northwestern Syria, the place located just a few kilometers north of the famous castle Krak des Chevaliers.

Demographically, the valley is a regional center of Christianity since the 6th century. Of its 32 villages, 27 are Christian (mainly Greek Orthodox), four are mainly populated by Alawite Muslims and one, al-Husn, which is adjacent to the Krak des Chevaliers, is mainly Sunni Islamic.

History 

It is said that the monastery was built over remains of an ancient statue of the god Homerus by the Byzantine Emperor Justinian I sometime in the 5th century. The monastery occupies a 6,000 m2 land and was built entirely from Byzantine styled stone.

The modern church was rebuilt in 1857. Most of the older monastery's items are preserved and displayed in the monastery. Its entrance features a triple arch and two central supporting columns of Byzantine origin. A historical big stone with religious carvings can be found in the monastery's southern gate. The wooden iconostasis found inside the church are decorated with impressive carvings and are magnificent presentations of art, its gold painted icons depict various scenes from the life of Christ. Beneath the monastery's main courtyard there is an older 13th century chapel with a smaller iconostasis, older than 300 years. Its icons depict scenes from the life of Saint George, a popular saint among Middle Eastern Christians. At this lower level there is also an entrance to what is believed to be the original 6th century monastery and several large amphoras. The Saint George Monastery also displays many other ancient items like crosses, writings, books, carvings, goblets, and other tools. It is also home to a manuscript written by the caliph Umar ibn al-Khattab, which discussed the relationships between Muslims and Christians.

The monastery is busiest during pilgrimages at the feast of Saint George (May 6) and the feast of the elevation of the Holy Cross on (September 14).

See also
 Saint George: Devotions, traditions and prayers

References 

Greek Orthodox Church of Antioch
Buildings and structures in Homs Governorate
Christian monasteries established in the 5th century
Christian monasteries in Syria
Greek Orthodoxy in Syria
5th-century establishments in the Byzantine Empire